Trewin may refer to:

Dennis Trewin AO (born 1946), Australian former public servant, head of the Australian Bureau of Statistics
Ion Trewin (1943–2015), British editor, publisher and author
J. C. Trewin OBE (1908–1990), British journalist, writer and drama critic
Kai Trewin (born 2001), Australian professional footballer
Max Trewin (1927–2005), Australian rules footballer
Morris Trewin, Canadian retired ice hockey goaltender
Todd Trewin (born 1958), American equestrian
Tom Trewin (1914–1992), Australian politician
Wendy Trewin (Wendy Monk) (1915–2000), English writer and critic

See also
Trewin Brothers (formerly and commonly known as John Lewis), a brand of high-end department stores throughout Great Britain